Rhein-Neckar-Halle is an 8,000-capacity indoor arena located in Eppelheim, Germany. During the 1970s and 1980s some of the biggest acts in the music industry performed at the venue, including Frank Zappa, Tina Turner, ZZ Top, Metallica, Genesis, Rush and AC/DC. It was built in 1970. Today it is primarily used for sports for the adjacent high school.

Since 2012 the arena is closed for events with more than 199 people and since then has only been used for school sports. It has been superseded as the main indoor arena in the region by other venues such as the Maimarkt-Halle and the SAP-Arena in nearby Mannheim. It will also get a new competitor in a new, under-construction arena in Heidelberg which is due to be completed in spring 2020.

References

Music venues in Germany
Indoor arenas in Germany